FC MAG is a futsal team based in Varna, Bulgaria. It plays in Bulgarian Futsal Championship. The club was officially founded in 1997 and refounded in 2003. Club colors are blue and white.

Achievements
 Champions of Bulgaria: 1 time (2004)

Current Squad 2008/09

MAG
Sport in Varna, Bulgaria
Futsal clubs established in 1997
1997 establishments in Bulgaria